Halbbruder can be:
 The German translation of half brother; see wikt:Halbbruder
 A rank in the Teutonic Knights